Nationality words link to articles with information on the nation's poetry or literature (for instance, Irish or France).

Events
1374:
 April 23 – English writer Geoffrey Chaucer is granted a gallon of wine a day for the rest of his life by order of King Edward III of England in recognition of his services.

Works published

1375:
 Barbour composes The Brus under the probable commission of Robert II in Scotland. The poem is an innovative blend of vernacular romance and chronicle genres.

Births
Death years link to the corresponding "[year] in poetry" article. There are conflicting or unreliable sources for the birth years of many people born in this period; where sources conflict, the poet is listed again and the conflict is noted:

1370:
 Andrea da Barberino (died 1431), Italian writer and poet
 John Lydgate (died 1451), English monk and poet
 Felip de Malla (died 1431), Catalan prelate, theologian, scholastic, orator, classical scholar, and poet

1375:
 Andreu Febrer (died 1444), Catalan Spanish translator of the Divine Comedy

1377:
 Nund Reshi (died 1440), Indian, Kashmiri-language poet

Deaths
Birth years link to the corresponding "[year] in poetry" article:

1370:
 Vedanta Desika (born 1269), poet, devotee, philosopher and master-teacher

1372:
 Seán Mór Ó Dubhagáin, Irish poet

1374:
 Gao Qi (born 1336), Chinese poet of the Ming dynasty
 Petrarch (born 1304), Italian scholar, poet and one of the earliest Renaissance humanists

1375:
 Chūgan Engetsu (born 1300), Japanese poet, occupies a prominent place in Japanese Literature of the Five Mountains

1377:
  Guillaume de Machaut (born c. 1300) French poet and composer, perhaps the most influential composer of the Middle Ages

See also

 Poetry
 14th century in poetry
 14th century in literature
 List of years in poetry
 Grands Rhétoriqueurs
 French Renaissance literature
 Renaissance literature
 Spanish Renaissance literature

Other events:
 Other events of the 14th century
 Other events of the 15th century

15th century:
 15th century in poetry
 15th century in literature

Notes

14th-century poetry
Poetry